Ogio may refer to:

Sir Michael Ogio, Papua New Guinean politician
Ogio, a brand owned by Callaway Golf Company since 2017